Centronopini is a tribe of darkling beetles in the family Tenebrionidae. There are at least three genera in Centronopini.

Genera
These genera belong to the tribe Centronopini:
 Centronopus Solier, 1848  (North America and the Neotropics)
 Scotobaenus Leconte, 1859  (North America)
 Tauroceras Hope, 1841  (the Neotropics)

References

Further reading

 
 

Tenebrionoidea